The British Army Training Unit Suffield (BATUS) is a British Army unit located at the vast training area of Canadian Forces Base Suffield near Suffield, Alberta, Canada. BATUS is the British Army's largest armoured training facility, and it can accommodate live-firing and tactical effect simulation (TES) exercises up to battle group level. CFB Suffield is seven times the size of Salisbury Plain Training Area and 19% the size of Northern Ireland, offering the British Army the ability to conduct large exercises that UK military bases cannot accommodate.

History 

A British chemical weapons testing facility was located in French-controlled Algeria. However, upon the conquest of France by Germany in 1940, the facility was lost. The British could find no suitable location in the UK, and an agreement was signed between Canada and the UK to allow the Suffield area to become available to British scientists for testing. Consequently, British and Canadian forces employed the area for a variety of experiments. Upon the end of World War II, the British departed the Suffield area and it was formally taken over by the Canadian Defence Research Board.

In 1969, Colonel Gaddafi led a coup in Libya, took control of the country and proceeded, after negotiations, to close down British military installations located at El Adem and Tobruk, and American installations located near Tripoli. This presented the UK with a problem, as there were no areas large enough to allow the British Army to undertake large-scale armoured warfare exercises in Europe. In 1971 a 10-year lease was signed between the British and Canadian Governments that authorized battle group training to take place in the Suffield area by the British Army. In January 1972, the British Army Training Unit Suffield was formally established. In July, the first live rounds were fired by the 4th Royal Tank Regiment Battle Group. In 1981, the lease for Suffield was extended, and in 1991, the lease was again extended. In 2006, on the expiration of this lease, the British and Canadian governments concluded an agreement that would allow British forces to maintain their training practices in Canada indefinitely.

Reports in September 2020 suggested that tank training at BATUS could be brought to an end as the Challenger 2 tanks age. Mayor of nearby city Medicine Hat, Ted Clugston (along with local MP Glen Motz) expressed concern about this, saying the base has been a "major economic stabilizing force since the 1970s". A 2007 estimate suggested that the unit injects $100 million into the local economy. In November 2021, reports suggested that the base would be closed in favour of the Omani-British Joint Training Area in Oman, however this was denied by Defence Secretary Ben Wallace who added that the base would see "change" but would not close. The MOD Press Office stated that the base would remain "a vital training base for the British Army".

Current 

Due to the hostile winters, BATUS conducts training from May to October each year. This normally consists of four to six battle groups (BGs) each exercising for around 24 days each, supported by the BATUS permanent and temporary staff and a dedicated enemy (traditionally provided by a single nominated regiment). There are relatively few servicemen permanently posted to BATUS (229 as of 2019, along with 250 dependent children), but their numbers are significantly increased by temporary staff who form the bulk of form the Operations Group (Ops Gp) who design and deliver the most complex live fire and simulated fully instrumented training for Armoured, Infantry and Strike Battlegroups. This, as well a large proportion of the camp based supporting organisations, including a dedicated logistics squadron and a REME workshop. Permanent postings to BATUS last two years. French-speaking local actors are often hired for exercises, to give soldiers experience of working with non-English speaking civilians.

A 30-day exercise, Prairie Fire, operates four times a year. It aims to precisely replicate the experience of being transported to a warzone, fighting, and returning to the UK. During the exercise, soldiers fight fictional "Donovians" in "Atropia".

During the winter months, some specialist Arctic warfare training is conducted on the Suffield Block by the Canadian Forces while the UK vehicle fleet is prepared for the following year.

1,400 soldiers and over 1,000 vehicles, including 22 Challenger 2 tanks, 112 CVR(T)s and 103 Bulldog armoured fighting vehicles (AFVs), are based in BATUS, alongside an undisclosed number of Warrior infantry fighting vehicles (IFVs), AS-90 self-propelled artillery, Trojan combat engineering vehicles, Titan armoured bridge layers and Gazelle helicopters (of 29 (BATUS) Flight AAC).

Stationed Units
HQ BATUS
Combat Ready Training Centre
Resident OPFOR - rotated every year. This is made up of either an armoured regiment or infantry battalion.
29 Flight, Army Air Corps
105 Logistic Support Squadron, Royal Logistic Corps
BATUS REME Workshop

See also

CFB Suffield
CFB Wainwright

References

External links

British Army - Canada

Foreign military bases in Canada
Training units and formations of the British Army
Canada–United Kingdom military relations
Military installations of the United Kingdom in other countries
Canada and the Commonwealth of Nations
United Kingdom and the Commonwealth of Nations